The Isuzu Giga is a line of heavy-duty commercial vehicles produced by Isuzu since 1994. Outside Japan it is known as Isuzu C/E series. It was formally known as the Isuzu Heavy-Duty Truck'. Between 1994 and 2016, it was also sold in South America (under the Chevrolet brand as Chevrolet C/E series).

First generation (1994–2015 for Japan, 1995–2022 for export)

 Introduced in November 1994 as the successor to the 810 series. The model of the motorcycle is KC-C ## series, and the tractor that will appear next year is KC-EX # series. A number representing the model is entered at the end of the model number. (Example: KC-CXZ81K1). This number means that it is type 1, and depending on the model such as dump truck, the alphabet is added after the number. For the first time in this model, a GVW 22t & 25t car has appeared. There are two types of cabs, a highway cab for cargo and an off-road cab for dump trucks. The highway cab has headlights on the bumper side. While the majority of cabs were still equipped with headlights, this giga can be said to be the forerunner of the style of equipping bumpers with headlights, which is now commonplace. The cab design, doors and lights are also the same as the 320 series forward that appeared in February of the same year. The rear door of the double cab car is 810 . The low-floor 4-axle vehicle is the GVW25t vehicle, which is the first heavy-duty truck in Japan with the same type of all-wheel axis (changed to 19.5-inch after 22.5-inch 265/60 ultra-flat tires). The GVW22t; 20t vehicle is the same as before. Five grades are available, Space Cruiser (dump is King Dump), High Custom, Custom, Standard Specification, Limited, and the highest grade Space Cruiser has electric curtain, wood grain panel, synthetic leather winding steering & It was equipped with a shift knob, etc., but the lowest grade Limited was a one-seater specification . 

 1995 : Added semi-tractor and all-wheel drive vehicle. The semi-tractor is equipped with a special plating molding on the front panel, and the part inside the molding is painted with gunmetal.

 1997 : It becomes type 2 with a minor change. 2 is entered at the end of the model number (example: KC-EXR82D2). The semi-tractor and gigamax have eight front panel grills. For the first time as a heavy-duty truck, all vehicles are equipped with SRS airbags for the driver's seat as standard equipment. Equipped with discharge headlights. The 6x4 semi-tractor is equipped with the domestic highest 600PS V-type 10-cylinder naturally aspirated engine 10TD1 . The front grille of the off-road cab semi-tractor has been changed from three slits to six holes. Released Gigamax with 4-bag air suspension . The straight-six engine car has a high cab, and the fender rubber has a thick shape. The straight-six cars have a higher cab, a dedicated bumper, headlights at a higher position than usual, and a license plate at a lower position than usual. From this model, the tires of 4-axle low-floor vehicles have a smaller total wheel diameter.

 2000 : Minor change to medium-term model. Conforms to 1999 emission regulations (KL-). It becomes type 3 (example: KL-EXR52D3). The grille on the front panel of the highway cab has an inverted trapezoidal design, and the engine has been changed from 12PE1 to 8TD1 for the V type and from 6WA1 to 6WF1 and 6WG1 for the straight-six engine. Since most of the models have moved to straight-six engines, the high cab style has been standardized according to the type 2 straight-six engine (there are also low cab specifications for specially equipped vehicles such as tank trucks). In addition, since the off-road cab car with a straight-six engine is a high cab, the front bumper is now diverting the specification without air dam for the highway cab (the headlight part is closed). The snorkel of a straight-six engine car has been changed from an elongated shape to a flat shape.

 June 2003 : There is no change in the design, but it becomes a 4 type with a minor change (example: KL-CYL23T4). Conforms to 2001 noise regulations. In addition to the semi-tractor, the full air brake was standardized and the naturally aspirated V-type engine was removed from the lineup and quickly unified into the intercooler turbo engine. Smoother G setting. Although the speed indicator was abolished, the lens shape of the speed indicator still remains on the high roof car, and it is painted in body color.

 November 2003 : Vehicles equipped with a 6WF1 engine are additionally set to comply with the 2004 emission regulations (new short-term emission regulations). The model is type 5 (example: PJ-CYL51V5Z). KL-No difference in appearance from the car.

 2004 : Setting of the completed car "G Cargo".

 August 2005 : Minor change to type 6 (example: PJ-CYJ51W6). The front bumper has been changed in appearance. The front bumper for low cab cars of type 1 and 2 is reused, and a spacer of a new part is attached to the top. Conforms to safety standards for lighting equipment (off-road cab is abolished). Bumpers with license plates below the headlights have disappeared. The position of the front license plate of all cars was unified to the same height as the headlights. The lens of the front turn signal was divided into two, the outside was the turn signal, and the back was the fog lamp. Strictly speaking, this combination lamp itself is a diversion of the 2000 MC model Super Dolphin Profia and Space Ranger. It was a change). Previously, the side turn signal installed in the blister fender of the cab had a built-in side reflector, but since the change was made to move only this reflector to the bumper corner, the reflector space of the side turn signal is a dummy. Fully comply with the 2004 emission regulations (new short-term emission regulations, PJ-). Replaced 6SD1 type engine with 6UZ1 type engine. As with Hino Motors ' Profia , which has a partnership with all-wheel drive vehicles to reduce costs , production has been discontinued. As with Profia, UD Trucks (formerly Nissan Diesel Industry) is an OEM of Quon 's all-wheel drive vehicles to meet the demand for snow removal vehicles and agricultural and livestock vehicles that require all-wheel drive vehicles.We are responding by receiving supply.

 April 1, 2006 : Added 2005 emission regulation compliant vehicles to vehicles equipped with 6UZ1 engine . Expansion of equipment for the completed "G Cargo" and additional settings for the "Super G Cargo" with a short cab and roof bed.

 March 2007 : A minor change was made in advance of a car equipped with a 6UZ1 engine. It is practically 7 type, but for some reason the model is 8 type by skipping 7 (example: PDG-CYL77V8). The grill design of the front lid has been changed to what is called a "6 cube". At the same time, it is also a big feature that the black belt that existed directly under the front window has disappeared. The "GIGA" logo has also been redesigned, and the front logo has been moved from the left side to the right side to share the image with the elf and forward. Low cab specifications are abolished. All vehicle types comply with the new long-term emission regulations, and vehicles that meet the 2015 fuel efficiency standards will be set as the main vehicle types. Newly developed millimeter-wave radar inter-vehicle distance warning device and cruise control as " VAT ". The garnish on the top of the bumper has been changed from black to gull gray.

 June 2007 : A minor change was delayed for vehicles equipped with the 6WG1 engine. An electronic vehicle attitude control system (IESC) is newly adopted for the tractor. 6WF1 type engine is abolished.

 October 2007 : Developed a collision damage mitigation brake that automatically decelerates during dangerous driving to reduce collision damage. Expand IESC to motorcycles.

 February 2009 : Mirrors for cargo vehicles have become aerodynamic, and door turn signals have been downsized and made into clear lenses to comply with the regulations (ECE / R48). In addition, a side monitoring monitor has been added to "VAT".

 May 17, 2010 : Big minor change. It is practically type 8, but the number at the end of the model disappears (example: LKG-CYL77A). The A at the end means that it is the first giga, and on models other than the long chassis, the alphabet indicating the length of the chassis is attached behind the A. The urea SCR system jointly developed with Hino is combined with DPD to comply with the 2009 emission regulations . As a general rule, motorcycles are unified with 6UZ1 type engine. A 16-speed MT with an auxiliary transmission is newly set for the dump truck (CXZ / CYZ). The cab has expanded the front grille area to improve engine cooling performance, and the headlights have been changed to the same ones as the forward increased ton specification car . Also, the 22.5 inch wheels have been changed from JIS standard 8 studs to ISO standard 10 studs.

 October 28, 2014 : Partially improved. VAT / IESC (Electronic Vehicle Attitude Control System) is standard equipment. A short cab is set for the 3-axle vehicle.

Defects and recalls
In 2008, 2,225 Japanese Giga models from the 2007 model year were recalled after it was discovered they had faulty fuel tank caps which could cause fuel inside the tank to leak.

In 2009, 5,475 Japanese Giga Turbo models from the 1999-2005 model years were recalled after it was discovered they had faulty turbos which could result in turbine blade damage and output may be insufficient, resulting in inability to operate.

In 2019, 1,205 Australian CX and EX models from the 2010 and 2019 model years were recalled after it was discovered they had faulty front under-run protection device (FUPD) reinforcement brackets which could cause the FUPD to fail if involved in a front-end collision.

Second generation (2015–present)

 Announced at the 2015 Tokyo Motor Show 2015 

 October 28, 2015 : Full model change of the second generation Giga motorcycle system ahead of the tractor system, and it is on sale nationwide. This is the first Isuzu heavy-duty truck to continue to undergo a full model change with the same car name (until now, the car name has changed from New Power to 810 to Giga for each FMC). The catch phrase is "Let's run, together."
 Most of the cab skeleton and components have been shared with forwards and elves (the new Giga's cab monocoque itself is the same as the forward wide cab), and the radiator opening has been expanded to improve cooling, aerodynamics and economic performance. .. In addition, parts such as headlights and mirrors continue to use the same parts as the original Giga after the 2010s, and interior lights etc. are diverted from Profia .
 In the interior of the cab, the instrument panel is made into a semi-round instrument panel to improve the holdability and breathability of the seat. In addition, a steering switch and a multi-information display with a 4-inch LCD monitor were adopted.
 There are four types of cabs: a full cab, a full cab high roof with a high ceiling, a bedless short cab, and a two-story short cab maxi roof with a bed above the cab. In addition, standard and custom grades are set.
 The engine continues to use the 6UZ1 with a displacement of 9.8L . However, improvements such as making the turbocharger continuously variable capacity have been made to improve low to medium speed torque. In addition, ecostop is standard equipment on cargo and dump trucks to improve fuel efficiency as well as improve the engine body.
 The transmission uses Smoother-Gx (Smoother Gx) . In addition, the braking ability of the auxiliary brake is improved by adopting the engine retarder as standard. In addition, the 6UZ1-TCS and 12-stage smoother Gx-equipped vehicles use the inertial driving function "Smart Glide" to improve fuel efficiency.
 The pre-crash brake system uses a double detection system that refers to the camera in addition to the millimeter-wave radar, which greatly improves the forward detection accuracy. In addition to the conventional collision damage mitigation braking function, a collision avoidance support function for moving obstacles has been added. In addition, when the camera recognizes the driving lane and the system determines that the vehicle deviates from the driving lane, a function is added to warn the driver by a lane departure warning by a warning sound and a display of a liquid crystal monitor in the meter.
 MIMAMORI , which is a development of the old Mimamori-kun, is adopted as standard, and various information support and easy grasp of vehicle condition are realized. In addition, by utilizing the vehicle data obtained by MIMAMORI in the advanced genuine maintenance system "PREISM", we have established a system to back up the securing of vehicle utilization rate.
 While equipped with the above-mentioned new innovations and new mechanisms, the weight increase from the conventional model is suppressed.
 December 24, 2015 : Added CNG vehicles. It is the first CNG vehicle in a heavy-duty truck and uses a 6UV1 engine .
 April 11, 2016 : Full model change of tractor. A standard roof car with a short cab will be added, and the engine will continue to use 6WG1 and 6UZ1 , but 6UZ1 will change the specifications of the turbocharger, increase the size of the intercooler and radiator, improve the efficiency of the EGR cooler, change the supply pump, new injector By adopting the above and the ultra-high pressure common rail, the torque has been increased and the fuel efficiency has been improved. In addition, a newly developed 7.8L 2-stage turbo 6NX1 engine has been added to the motorcycle system.
 April 27, 2017 : Minor change of motorcycle system. Conforms to 2016 emission regulations. Vehicles equipped with Smoother Gx adopt the inertial driving function "Smart Glide + g" to improve fuel efficiency. In addition to changing the headlights and interior lights to LEDs, the meter lighting was always turned on. In addition, a vehicle equipped with a 6NX1 engine was added to the 6x4 mixer  .
 October 25, 2017 : Based on G Cargo, specially equipped with a special cab color of ash beige metallic, genuine leather-like seat with ISUZU logo embroidered, red seat belt, etc. "Isuzu Motors 80th Anniversary Special Specification Limited to 100 cars sold  .
 June 22, 2018 : Minor change of tractor. As with motorcycles, it complies with 2016 emission regulations. Vehicles equipped with Smoother Gx adopt the inertial driving function "Smart Glide + g" to improve fuel efficiency. In addition to changing the headlights and interior lights to LEDs, the meter lighting was always turned on. In addition, a 4x2 air suspension vehicle with a wheelbase of 3,830mm and a fifth wheel load of 11.5t was newly added . 
 December 26, 2019 : Minor change of motorcycle system. The catch phrase is "For tomorrow when I can run more."
 In terms of safety, a pedestrian / bicycle detection function has been added to the pre-crash brake system. In addition, variable light distribution type LED headlamps, driver status monitor, and blind spot monitor are standard equipment on all models, and all vehicle speed millimeter-wave inter-vehicle cruises are standard equipment on vehicles equipped with Smoother Gx. A high roof with a total height of 3.8 m is standard equipment on some models, and seats made by Islinghausen are standard equipment on some models to improve comfort. Functions for "MIMAMORI" and "PREISM" have also been added, and items such as battery voltage have been added. In addition to setting a tire pressure monitoring system as an option, it is also equipped with a safety drive reporting function that reports the operating status and usage status of safety devices  .
 On February 27, 2020 , Lane Keep Assist was set as an option for some motorcycle models, and rear wheel super single tires were set for some models. Lane Keep Assist is also equipped with a lane keeping support function, a lane departure prevention function, and a power steering assist function at low speeds  .
 On April 28, 2020, a minor change was made to the tractor. As with the motorcycle system, safety has been improved, and a pedestrian / bicycle detection function has been added to the pre-crash brake system. Variable light distribution type LED headlamps, driver status monitor, and blind spot monitor are standard equipment on all models, and all vehicle speed millimeter-wave inter-vehicle cruises are standard equipment on vehicles equipped with Smoother Gx. In addition, a axle load monitor is standard equipment on some models. As with the motorcycle system, the comfortability has been improved, and a high roof with a total height of 3.8 m is standard equipment on some models, and Islinghausen seats are standard equipment on some models. Functions for "MIMAMORI" and "PREISM" have also been added, and items such as battery voltage have been added. In addition to setting a tire pressure monitoring system as an option, it is also equipped with a safety drive reporting function that reports the operating status and usage status of safety devices  .
 Minor change on May 14, 2021 . The Emergency Driving Stop System (EDSS), which is the first truck to handle abnormal drivers , has been set as an option for all models. The driver abnormality response system is a combination of an abnormality automatic detection type and a push button type, and operates when the driver status monitor (DSM) detects an abnormality in the driver or the driver himself presses the EDSS switch. After operation, the status will be notified to the registered e-mail address. It is also equipped with an EDSS cancel switch as a countermeasure against erroneous operation of the EDSS switch by the driver  .

With the full model change, the symbol at the end of the model has been changed from the original Giga QKG-CYL77 A to QPG-CYL77 B , for example, in 6x2.

Line up
 CVR (4 × 2)
 CXK (6 × 2R) NK suspension
 CXM (6 × 2R)
 CYM (6 × 2R) GVW over 20t
 CYL (6 × 2R) GVW 20t super air suspension
 CXG (6 × 2F)
 CXE (6 × 2F) Air suspension
 CYG (6 × 2F) GVW over 20t
 CYE (6 × 2F) GVW 20t super air suspension
 CXY (6 × 4) air suspension
 CXZ (6 × 4)
 CYZ (6 × 4) GVW over 20t
 CYY (6 × 4) GVW 20t super air suspension
 CVZ (low floor 6 × 4) GVW18t specification
 CXZ-J (Low floor 6 × 4)
 CYZ-J (low floor 6 × 4) GVW over 20t
 CYY-J (Low floor 6 × 4) GVW 20t super / air suspension
 CXH (low floor 8 × 4)
 CYH (low floor 8 × 4) GVW over 20t
 CYJ (low floor 8 × 4) GVW 20t super air suspension
 CVS (4 × 4) chassis for snowplows
 CXW (6 × 6) chassis for snowplows
 CYW (6 × 6) GVW 20t super / snowplow chassis
 EXR (4 × 2 semi-tractor)
 EXD (4 × 2 semi-tractor) air suspension
 EXZ (6 × 4 semi-tractor)
 EXY (6 × 4 semi-tractor) air suspension

Onboard Engine

"Category" in the table below indicates the next two digits of the three letters of the vehicle type alphabet (C ** or EX * above).

See also
 Isuzu Elf
 Isuzu Forward

References

External links

 Isuzu Giga Homepage
 Isuzu Giga Tipper Review

Giga
Cab over vehicles
Vehicles introduced in 1994